John Worth Kern Jr. (1900–1971) was the 31st mayor of the city of Indianapolis, Indiana.

Kern graduated from Washington and Lee University in 1920 and Harvard Law School in 1923. Prior to serving as mayor, Kern was a judge on the Superior Court of Marion County. He took office as mayor in 1935 and resigned on September 2, 1937, when President Franklin D. Roosevelt appointed him to a seat on the U.S. Board of Tax Appeals, which later became the United States Tax Court. Kern was reappointed by President Truman in 1950 when his first term expired and served as chief judge before retiring from active service on June 30, 1961.

Kern's father was Senator John W. Kern, the first Senate Majority Leader, and his son was John W. Kern III, a judge of the District of Columbia Court of Appeals. His grandson, John W. Kern IV, is also a lawyer.

References

Mayors of Indianapolis
Indiana Democrats
Superior court judges in the United States
20th-century American politicians
Judges of the United States Tax Court
Washington and Lee University alumni
Harvard Law School alumni
1900 births
1971 deaths
United States Article I federal judges appointed by Franklin D. Roosevelt
Members of the United States Board of Tax Appeals